Events in the year 2022 in Morocco.

Incumbents
 King: Mohammed VI
 President of the Government: Aziz Akhannouch

Events

 1 August – Kobi Shabtai makes the first official visit to Morocco of an Israel Police Commissioner to meet with senior Moroccan police and government officials for discussions regarding strengthening operational, intelligence, and investigative cooperation between the two countries.

September
 13 September – Lieutenant General Belkhir El-Farouk, Inspector General of the Royal Moroccan Armed Forces makes an official visit to Israel and is welcomed by an honor guard headed by the Chief of Staff of the Israeli Army, Aviv Kochavi.

Sports
 29 March - Morocco qualifies for the 2022 FIFA World Cup.
 20 May -  RS Berkane are 2022 CAF Confederation Cup winners after defeating Orlando Pirates F.C. in penalties in the Final.
 30 May -  Wydad AC are 2022 CAF Champions League winners after defeating Al Ahly (2-0) in the Final.
 10 September - RS Berkane are 2022 CAF Super Cup winners after defeating Wydad AC in the Final.
 10 December - After defeating Portugal in the 2022 FIFA World Cup quarter final, Morocco reaches the semi-final of a World Cup for the first time in its history, also becoming the first African national football team to do so.

Deaths
On 5 February, his death was announced after he was pulled out of the well
 11 June – Hilary Devey, English businesswoman and television personality (born 1957 in England)
 25 September - Aïcha Chenna, Moroccan social worker, women's rights advocate and activist.
 6 October - *, ??, Moroccan singer.

See also

 Western Sahara
 Sahrawi Arab Democratic Republic
 COVID-19 pandemic in Africa
 2020s
 African Union
 Berber languages
 Republic of the Rif
 Arab League
 Morocco–United States relations

References

 
2020s in Morocco
Years of the 21st century in Morocco
Morocco
Morocco